The Tauanui River is a river of the South Wairarapa District of the Wellington Region of New Zealand's North Island. It flows northwest from its source in the Aorangi Range to reach the Ruamahanga River close to the southern end of Lake Wairarapa.

See also
List of rivers of New Zealand

References

Rivers of the Wellington Region
Rivers of New Zealand